Fuller Asbury Kimbrell (June 22, 1909 – June 17, 2013) was an American politician and author.

Born in Berry, Alabama, he owned metal pipe and asphalt plants and a John Deere dealership. He served in the Alabama State Senate from 1947 to 1955 as a Democrat and was an advisor to the Governors of Alabama. Kimbrell served as Alabama State Finance Director. He wrote three books about his life: From the Farm House to the State House, You Wouldn't Believe, But It's So, and It made a Difference.

Notes

1909 births
2013 deaths
People from Fayette County, Alabama
Businesspeople from Alabama
Democratic Party Alabama state senators
Writers from Alabama
American centenarians
Men centenarians
20th-century American businesspeople